Saône-et-Loire is one of the four departments of Burgundy. Tourism in this region is founded on its varied landscape (the Saône plain, the Mâconnais, and the Charolais), its gastronomy with the prestigious mâconnais  wines, the charolais beef, the poulet de Bresse (Bresse chicken), and its rich architectural sites, (Autun, Cluny, Paray-le-Monial, and Tournus)

Sights

Natural sites

 The Arboretum de Pézanin,
 Azé’s grottes 
 The Régional Natural Park of the Morvan
 The Saint-Cyr Mount, the top of southern Burgundy
 The Roche de Solutré

Cities and villages

 Mâcon, city in wine site
 Charolles, cradle of the charolais beef
 Autun, Morvan’s door
 Berzé-le-Châtel, strengthen village
 Cluny, and its millennium abbey
 Dompierre-les-Ormes, with the ‘’Galerie Européenne de la Forêt et du bois’’ and the Arboretum de Pézanin

Public opened castle

 Château de Sully
 Château de Pierreclos
 Château de Cormatin
 Château de Drée
 Château de Saint-Point
 Château de Couches
 Château de Pierre-de-Bresse

Important tourist sites
 The Galerie européenne de la forêt et du bois (European Gallery of forest and wood)
 The Cluny abbey, et the Haras of Cluny,
 The Taizé community,
 EuroVelo 6 and green ways 
  Wine: the hameau Dubœuf, in Romanèche-Thorins, wines of the chalonais and maconnais

Wine

Mâconnais :

Chalonnais :

Most visited sites

References

 

Tourism in France